Brown Peninsula is a nearly ice-free peninsula,  long and  wide, which rises above the Ross Ice Shelf northward of Mount Discovery, to which it is connected by a low isthmus. It was discovered by the British National Antarctic Expedition, 1901–04, which named it "Brown Island" because of its color and its island-like character. Since it is a peninsula, the name has been altered accordingly.

See also
Ebon Pond

References 

Peninsulas of Antarctica
Landforms of Victoria Land
Scott Coast